Elmo Wright (born July 3, 1949) is a former American football wide receiver in the National Football League (NFL). While at the University of Houston, he became the first football player ever to perform an end zone dance.  

Wright was an All-American receiver for the Cougars and, somewhere during his collegiate career, he began the practice of "high-stepping" into the end zone at the end of long touchdown receptions.  While this was no comparison to the antics later displayed by such famed celebrators as Billy "White Shoes" Johnson, Ickey Woods or Terrell Owens, it was almost equally shocking at the time.  

Following his college playing days, Wright went on to star for the Kansas City Chiefs.

He currently resides in Houston, Texas.

References

1949 births
Living people
People from Brazoria, Texas
All-American college football players
American football wide receivers
Houston Cougars football players
People from Houston
Kansas City Chiefs players
Houston Oilers players
New England Patriots players
Alumni of George Washington Carver High School (Sweeny, Texas)